Fawn Lake may refer to:

 Fawn Lake (Inlet, Hamilton County, New York)
 Fawn Lake (Lake Pleasant, Hamilton County, New York)
 Fawn Lake Township, Todd County, Minnesota